Ganophyllum is a genus of flowering plants in the soapberry family, Sapindaceae.

Species include:
Ganophyllum falcatum Blume — scaly ash, scaly bark ash, Daintree hickory, honeywood
Ganophyllum giganteum (A.Chev.) Hauman

References

External links

Sapindaceae genera
Dodonaeoideae